The COVID-19 pandemic was confirmed to have reached Åland, an autonomous region of Finland, in March 2020.


Background
On 12 January 2020, the World Health Organization (WHO) confirmed that a novel coronavirus was the cause of a respiratory illness in a cluster of people in Wuhan City, Hubei Province, China, which was reported to the WHO on 31 December 2019.

The case fatality ratio for COVID-19 has been much lower than SARS of 2003, but the transmission has been significantly greater, with a significant total death toll.

Timeline
On 22 March 2020, the first case in the Åland Islands was confirmed.

On 13 April 2020, the Islands reached a total of 10 cases.

Cases by municipalities

See also
 COVID-19 pandemic by country and territory
 COVID-19 pandemic in Europe

References

Åland Islands
Åland Islands
Åland Islands
Åland Islands
Åland Islands
History of Åland